This  list of locomotives includes notable locomotives and locomotive classes that have a corresponding Wikipedia article. A locomotive or engine is a rail transport vehicle that provides the motive power for a train. If a locomotive is capable of carrying a payload, it is usually referred to as a multiple unit, motor coach, railcar or power car; the use of these self-propelled vehicles is increasingly common for passenger trains, but rare for freight (see CargoSprinter).

By company

American Locomotive Company

The American Locomotive Company (often shortened to ALCO, ALCo or Alco) was an American manufacturer of locomotives, diesel generators, steel, and tanks that operated from 1901 to 1969.

Baldwin Locomotive Works

The Baldwin Locomotive Works (BLW) was an American manufacturer of railroad locomotives from 1825 to 1951.

British Rail
British Rail is both a manufacturer and an operator of locomotives.

Steam 

 BR Standard Class 9F
 92220 Evening Star

Diesel and electric

 British Rail Class 53
 British Rail Class 55

Bulgarian State Railways 

The Bulgarian State Railways are Bulgaria's state railway company and the largest railway carrier in the country, established as an entity in 1888.

Diesel 

 BDŽ class 75
 BDŽ class 76
 BDŽ class 77

Electro-Motive Diesel

Electroputere

Fairbanks-Morse

GE Transportation

Great Western Railway

 Castle Class
 City Class
 3440 City of Truro
 Star Class
 The Great Bear

Indian Railways

 Indian Locomotive Class WDM-2
 Indian locomotive class WAP-4
 Indian locomotive class WAP-5
 Indian locomotive class WAP-7
 Indian locomotive class WAG-9
 Indian locomotive class WDG-4
 Indian locomotive class WDP-4
 Indian locomotive class WAG-12
 Indian locomotives class WDG-4G

Ingalls Shipbuilding
 Ingalls 4-S

Lima-Hamilton
 See List of Lima-Hamilton diesel locomotives

London and North Eastern Railway

 LNER Class A3
 4472 Flying Scotsman
 LNER Class A4
 4468 Mallard
 4488 Union of South Africa

London, Brighton and South Coast Railway

 LBSCR K Class

Montreal Locomotive Works

 Selkirk locomotive

New Zealand Railways
 A class of 1873
 A class of 1906
 AA class
 AB class
 B class of 1874
 B class of 1899
 BA class
 BB class
 BC class
 C class of 1873
 C class of 1930
 DA class
 DB class
 DC class
 DE class
 DF class of 1954
 DF class of 1979
 DG class
 DH class
 DI class
 DJ class
 DL class
 DQ class
 DX class
 E class of 1872
 E class of 1906
 E class of 1922
 EB class
 EF class
 EO class of 1923
 EW class
 F class
 G class
 H class
 J class of 1874
 J class of 1939
 K class of 1877
 K class of 1932
 KA class
 KB class
 LA class
 N class
 NA class
 NC class
 O class
 OA class
 OB class
 OC class
 P class of 1876
 P class of 1885
 Q class
 R class
 T class
 WAB class
 WB class
 WD class
 WF class
 X class

Norfolk and Western Railway
 A Class
 J Class

Norwegian State Railways
 NSB Class XXI
 NSB Class XXII

Victorian Railways
(Including its successor V/Line)

Steam
 'Old' A 4-4-0 (1884)
 'New' A 4-4-0 (1889)
 AA 4-4-0 (1900)
 A2 4-6-0 (1907)
 B 2-4-0 (1861)
 C 4-4-0WT (1886)
 C 2-8-0 (1918)
 'Rodgers' D 4-4-0 (1876)
 D 4-4-0 (1887)
 DD, D1, D2 and D3 4-6-0 (1902)
 /D4 4-6-2T (1908)
 E 2-4-2T (1889) and EE 0-6-2T (1893)
 F 2-4-0 (1874), later 2-4-2T (1910)
 G 4-4-0 (1877)
 G class 2-6-0+0-6-2 (1925) (narrow gauge)
 H 4-4-0 (1877)
 H 4-8-4 (1941)
 J 2-2-2, later 2-4-0 (1859)
 J 2-8-0 (1954)
 K 2-4-0 (1874)
 K 2-8-0 (1922)
 L 2-4-0ST (1861)
 M 4-4-0T (1879)
 ME 4-4-2T (1901)
 N 2-4-0WT (1886)
 N 2-8-2 (1925)
 NA class 2-6-2T (1898) (narrow gauge)
 O 0-6-0 (1861)
 P 0-6-0 (1859)
 Pier 0-4-0WT (1880)
 Q 0-6-0 (1873)
 'Belgian' R 0-6-0 (1883)
 'Old' R 0-6-0 (1879)
 'New' R and RY 0-6-0 (1889)
 R 4-6-4 (1951)
 S 4-6-0 (1880)
 S 4-6-2 (1928)
 T 0-6-0 (1874)
 U 0-6-0 (1873)
 'Old' V 0-6-0 (1857)
 V 2-8-0 (1899)
 W 4-6-0 (1880)
 X 0-6-0 (1886)
 X 2-8-2 (1929)
 Y 0-6-0 (1888)
 Z 2-4-0T and 0-6-0T (1893)

Diesel
 A Class Co-Co (1983) (V/Line)
 B class Co-Co (1952)
 C class Co-Co (1977)
 F class 0-6-0 (1951)
 G class Co-Co (1984) (V/Line)
 H class Bo-Bo (1968)
 M class 0-6-0 (1959)
 N class Co-Co (1985) (V/Line)
 P class Bo-Bo (1984) (V/Line)
 S class Co-Co (1957)
 T class Bo-Bo (1955)
 V class 0-4-0 (1959)
 W class 0-6-0 (1959)
 X class Co-Co (1966)
 Y class Bo-Bo (1963)

Electric
 E class Bo-Bo (1923)
 L class Co-Co (1953)

Significant individual locomotives

of the United Kingdom
Salamanca (1812), first commercially successful steam locomotive, first to have two cylinders.
Puffing Billy (1813-14), oldest surviving locomotive.
GWR 3700 Class 3440 City of Truro, a GWR 3700 Class 4-4-0 steam locomotive built in 1903 for the Great Western Railway (GWR) at Swindon Works to a design by George Jackson Churchward. Some believe the locomotive to be the first to attain a speed of  during a run from Plymouth to London Paddington in 1904.
Flying Scotsman (1923), oldest operating steam locomotive.

of the United States
DeWitt Clinton (1831), influential in demonstrating cost-effectiveness and speed of railways, defeating canals.
The General (1855) of the Great Locomotive Chase through Georgia in the American Civil War.

Biggest locomotives

Preserved locomotives

Canada
Hillcrest Lumber Company 9, a Climax Locomotive Works locomotive at British Columbia Forest Discovery Centre, Duncan, British Columbia

China

China has at least six preserved locomotives:
Three in the China Railways SN class:
China Railways SN No.23, in the China Railway Museum
China Railways SN No.26, in the Shanghai Railway Museum,
China Railways SN No.29, in the Yunnan Railway Museum.
At least three more locomotives at the Yunnan Railway Museum

India

India has 40 or more preserved locomotives.

Fairy Queen (1855), formerly the oldest steam locomotive in regular service, located at National Rail Museum or at Rewari Railway Heritage Museum or put on occasional heritage runs
Sir Leslie Wilson (1928), a WCG-1 electric locomotive which belonged to the Great Indian Peninsular Railway (presently Central Railway), a khaki which moaned. At National Rail Museum.
Sir Roger Lumley (1930), a WCP-1 electric locomotive, at National Rail Museum
Two more locomotives at National Rail Museum.
At least two locomotives at Chennai Rail Museum, Chennai
Three at Rail Museum, Howrah, Kolkata
Nine at Railway Museum, Mysore, Mysore
Ten others at Rewari Railway Heritage Museum, National Capital Region
Eleven preserved WDM-2 locomotives at scattered other locations.

There is also DHR 778 (1889), built in Glasgow, the only Darjeeling Himalayan Railway locomotive now located outside Indua, which is now preserved in Oxfordshire, England

United Kingdom
With some overlap between sublists, preserved locomotives in the UK include:
More than 100 preserved British industrial steam locomotives, not including fireless ones
About 30 preserved fireless steam locomotives in Britain

Preserved locomotives of heritage railway in England
Steam locomotives and diesel locomotives of the Bluebell Railway
Steam locomotives, diesel locomotives, and multiple units of the Bodmin and Wenford Railway 
Great Central Railway locomotives
Isle of Wight Steam Railway

United States
See Preserved locomotives in the United States.

References

 
Locomotives
Railway locomotive-related lists